South Hackensack School District is a community public school district serving students in pre-kindergarten through eighth grade from South Hackensack, in Bergen County, New Jersey, United States.

As of the 2020–21 school year, the district, comprised of one school, had an enrollment of 286 students and 23.4 classroom teachers (on an FTE basis), for a student–teacher ratio of 12.2:1.

The district is classified by the New Jersey Department of Education as being in District Factor Group "CD", the sixth-highest of eight groupings. District Factor Groups organize districts statewide to allow comparison by common socioeconomic characteristics of the local districts. From lowest socioeconomic status to highest, the categories are A, B, CD, DE, FG, GH, I and J.

Students in public school for ninth through twelfth grades attend Hackensack High School as part of a sending/receiving relationship with the Hackensack Public Schools, together with students from Maywood and Rochelle Park. As of the 2020–21 school year, the high school had an enrollment of 1,806 students and 137.8 classroom teachers (on an FTE basis), for a student–teacher ratio of 13.1:1.

History
The district had previously served students from Teterboro, who had attended the district as part of a sending/receiving relationship. Teterboro, a non-operating district was merged into the Hasbrouck Heights School District following its dissolution on July 1, 2010.

School
Memorial School had an enrollment of 273 students in grades PreK-8 as of the 2021–22 school year.

Administration
Core members of the district's administration include:
Jason Chirichella, Superintendent / Principal
Dina Messery, Business Administrator / Board Secretary

References

External links
District website
 
School Data for the South Hackensack School District, National Center for Education Statistics

South Hackensack, New Jersey
New Jersey District Factor Group CD
School districts in Bergen County, New Jersey